The Party for Justice, Integration and Unity (or PDIU) is a nationalist, right-wing political party in Albania whose primary aim is the promotion of national issues. The party focuses on highlighting national issues, including Kosovo recognition, Albanians in North Macedonia, Montenegro, Presevo Valley and especially the Cham issue.

Formation and leadership
It was formed as a union of the Party for Justice and Integration and the Party for Justice and Unity. Shpëtim Idrizi is its current chairman, while Tahir Muhedini is now the honorary president.

PDIU involvement in 2011 general registration
In early October 2011, the Albanian government announced that a census would be conducted throughout the country, which would tally the exact number of ethnic minorities for the first time after 1989. However, after a proposal by the PDIU, the Albanian parliament changed the Census law, establishing a fine of $1,000 to every citizen that declares an ethnicity different from what was written down on his or her birth certificate. This applies even if the certificate was written during the communist era before 1989, where ethnic minorities were pressured to renounce their minority status.

Because of these developments, organizations that represent five minority groups in Albania decided unanimously to boycott the upcoming census. On the other hand, the PDIU, claimed that this decision was a national victory, prohibiting that way a part of local citizens (according to PDIU also non-Greek) to register as Greeks.

Local elections

The PDIU placed candidates in the following places:

Dibër County
Komuna Kalaja e Dodës - Zyber Lita
Tiranë County
Njësia Bashkiake nr. 7 Tiranë - Krenar Alimehmeti
Bashkia Rrogozhinë - Ndriçim Dushku
Komuna Golem - Engjëll Murrizi
Durrës County
Bashkia Sukth - Sherif Fortuzi
Komuna Bubq, Krujë - Skënder Gjoni
Elbasan County
Bashkia Librazhd - Shefki Çota
Komuna Kukri, Gramsh - Behar Kokla
Fier County
Bashkia Patos - Dilaver Kamberaj
Vlorë County
Komuna Markat - Ismail Myrtaj
Komuna Shushicë - Lulzim Petani

In the Albanian local elections, 2011 the Party for Justice, Integration and Unity won a total of 59,499 votes throughout the country, and won the Librazhd, Sukth, and Rrogozhinë municipalities, plus Markat and Shushicë communes.

2015 local elections

In 2015 local elections PJIU won in three municipalities: Peqin, Rrogozhine and Konispol.

Parliamentary representation

2013 election
PDIU joined the Alliance for Employment, Prosperity and Integration in the 2013 elections. The coalition was led by former Prime Minister Sali Berisha. PDIU got 44,957 votes, 2.61% translated in 4 seats in the new parliament. Shpëtim Idrizi got elected as well, bringing the number of seats to 5, but he came through the list of Democratic Party in Fier County.

Aqif Rakipi       for Elbasan County
Dashamir Tahiri for Vlorë County
Omer Mamo         for Fier County
Tahir Muhedini    for Tiranë County
Mesila Doda       for Fier County (joined after leaving the Democratic Party)

2017 parliamentary elections
In 2017, PDIU won three mandates of deputies: 2 in Elbasan (Aqif Rakipi and Bujar Muca) and 1 in Diber (Reme Lala). Shpetim Idrizi and Mesila Doda published videos in Facebook that their votes were stolen from another party, so the votes in Tirana were recounted, but they couldn't get their mandates either.

2021 parliamentary elections
In 2021, PDIU joined the Coalition PD–AN  
and won three mandates of deputies.

Nusret Avdulla for Fier County
Shpetim Idrizi for Tiranë County
Mesila Doda for Tiranë County

See also
Shoqata Çameria

Notes

References

External links
Official website
Party's Programme
Party's Theme Song

Albanian nationalist parties
Political parties established in 2011
2011 establishments in Albania
Nationalist parties in Europe
Right-wing parties in Europe
Social conservative parties
Cham Albanians